Birmingham General Hospital was a teaching hospital in Birmingham, England, founded in 1779 and closed in the mid-1990s.

History

Summer Lane 

In 1765, a committee for a proposed hospital, formed by John Ash and supported by Sir Lister Holte, 5th Baronet, the Earl of Bradford, Samuel Garbett, Sir Henry Gough, Charles Adderley, Matthew Boulton, John Baskerville, Sampson Lloyd and others, purchased:

from a Mrs Dolphin, for £120 per acre. (Walmore Lane is now Lancaster Street.) However, work to erect the new hospital on that land stopped through lack of funds in 1766. Eventually, much of its funds came from the Birmingham Triennial Music Festival, the first of which was held over three days in September 1768, and which continued to fund the hospital into the 20th century.

The hospital finally opened on 20 September 1779, giving its name to Hospital Street. About 200 patients were treated in its first three months of operation, even though the 40 beds were fewer than half those aimed for. Two, two-storey side wings were added in 1790. Further extensions were made in 1857 and 1880. Eventually 235 beds were provided on the site. The site was later used for a tram, then bus, depot and is now occupied by Centro House, headquarters of the Transport for West Midlands, where there is a blue plaque (at ) commemorating the hospital.

Steelhouse Lane 

The hospital relocated to Steelhouse Lane in 1897, on a site formerly occupied by almshouses provided by Lench's Trust. The architect of the new, brick building was William Henman. Neville Chamberlain became an Official Visitor and then a director of the hospital. He advocated a larger facility, a cause in which he was eventually successful, though building did not commence until 1934. He was still fundraising while he was Prime Minister.

The hospital became part of the new National Health Service in 1948. Until 1964 the hospital was a training centre for nurses, who, on qualification, became members of the General Hospital Birmingham Nurses League. After 1964, training switched to Queen Elizabeth Hospital in the nearby suburb of Edgbaston. The league was wound up in 2000, due to its remaining members' increasing age.

The Birmingham pub bombings, the worst terrorist attack on the mainland until 2005, occurred within a mile of the hospital, on 21 November 1974. Taxi cabs and all available ambulances ferried victims to either the General or to the nearby Accident Hospital.

After Birmingham General Hospital closed in the mid-1990s, the main red brick building was adapted for use as Birmingham Children's Hospital which opened there in 1998.

Notable staff 

 John Ash (1723–1798)
 Richard Lindsey Batten (1920–1997)
 Sir William Bowman, 1st Baronet (1816–1892)
 Sir Thomas Frederick Chavasse (1854 - 1913)
 Balthazar Foster, 1st Baron Ilkeston (1840–1913)
 George Freer (founder of the city's Orthopaedic Hospital)
 Sampson Gamgee (1828–1886)
 John Hall-Edwards (1858–1926)
 Joseph Hodgson (1788–1869)
 John Johnstone (1801–1833)
 Robert Mills-Roberts (1862–1935)
 Dame Ellen Musson (1867–1960)
 Arthur Thomson (1890–1977)
 William Withering (1741–1799)

Notable births 
 Bert Harris (1873–1897), professional racing cyclist

Archives 
Archives related to Birmingham General Hospital are held at the Cadbury Research Library, University of Birmingham.

Arms

Notes

References 

 

Hospital buildings completed in the 18th century
Buildings and structures completed in 1779
Hospital buildings completed in 1897
Defunct hospitals in England
Teaching hospitals in England
History of Birmingham, West Midlands
1779 establishments in England
Hospitals in Birmingham, West Midlands